Diving at the 2014 South American Games was held in Santiago, Chile from March 15 to 16, 2014. Three competitions were held, two for men and one for women. All competition took place at the Aquatic Center National Stadium.

Medalists

Men

Women

Medal table

Participating nations
A total of 28 athletes from 5 nations competed in diving at the 2014 South American Games:

 (6)
 (5)
 (6)
 (6)
 (5)

References

External links
Diving results – 2014 South American Games

 
D
South American Games
2014